The Return of Tarzan is a novel by American writer Edgar Rice Burroughs, the second in his series of twenty-four books about the title character Tarzan. It was first published in the pulp magazine New Story Magazine in the issues for June through December 1913; the first book edition was published in 1915 by A. C. McClurg.

Plot summary
The novel picks up soon after where Tarzan of the Apes left off. The ape man, feeling rootless in the wake of his noble sacrifice of his prospects of wedding Jane Porter, leaves USA for Europe to visit his friend Paul d'Arnot. On the ship he becomes embroiled in the affairs of Countess Olga de Coude, her husband, Count Raoul de Coude, and two shady characters attempting to prey on them, Nikolas Rokoff and his henchman Alexis Paulvitch. Rokoff, it turns out, is also the countess's brother. Tarzan thwarts the villains' scheme, making them his deadly enemies.

Later, in France, Rokoff tries time and time again to eliminate the ape man, finally engineering a duel between him and the count by making it appear that he is the countess's lover. Tarzan deliberately refuses to defend himself in the duel, even offering the count his own weapon after the latter fails to kill him with his own, a grand gesture that convinces his antagonist of his innocence. In return, Count Raoul finds him a job as a special agent in the French ministry of war. Tarzan is assigned to service in Algeria.

A sequence of adventures among the local Arabs ensues, including another brush with Rokoff. Afterward Tarzan sails for Cape Town and strikes up a shipboard acquaintance with Hazel Strong, a friend of Jane's. But Rokoff and Paulovitch are also aboard, and manage to ambush him and throw him overboard.

Miraculously, Tarzan manages to swim to shore, and finds himself in the coastal jungle where he was brought up by the apes. He soon rescues and befriends a native warrior, Busuli of the Waziri, and is adopted into the Waziri tribe. After defeating a raid on their village by ivory raiders, Tarzan becomes their chief.

The Waziri know of a lost city deep in the jungle, from which they have obtained their golden ornaments. Tarzan has them take him there, but is captured by its inhabitants, a race of ape-like men, and is condemned to be sacrificed to their sun god. To Tarzan's surprise, the priestess to perform the sacrifice is a beautiful woman who speaks the ape language he learned as a child. She tells him she is La, high priestess of the lost city of Opar. When the sacrificial ceremony is fortuitously interrupted, she hides Tarzan and promises to lead him to freedom. But the ape man escapes on his own, locates a treasure chamber, and manages to rejoin the Waziri.

Meanwhile, Hazel Strong has reached Cape Town where she meets Jane and her father, Professor Porter, together with Jane's fiancé, Tarzan's cousin William Cecil Clayton. They are all invited on a cruise up the west coast of Africa aboard the Lady Alice, the yacht of another friend, Lord Tennington. Rokoff, now using the alias of M. Thuran, ingratiates himself with the party and is also invited along. The Lady Alice breaks down and sinks, forcing the passengers and crew into the lifeboats. The one containing Jane, Clayton and "Thuran" is separated from the others and suffers terrible privations. Coincidentally, the boat finally makes shore in the same general area that Tarzan did.

The three construct a rude shelter and eke out an existence of near starvation for some weeks until Jane and William Clayton are surprised in the forest by a lion. Clayton loses Jane's respect by cowering in fear before the beast instead of defending her, but they are not attacked and discover the lion dead, speared by an unknown hand. Their hidden savior is in fact Tarzan, who does not reveal himself due to anger at seeing Jane still with Clayton. Tarzan renounces any dealings with other humans, abandons the Waziri, and rejoins his original ape clan. Jane breaks off her engagement to William.

Later Jane is kidnapped and taken to Opar by a party of the Oparian ape-men who were pursuing their escaped sacrifice, Tarzan. The ape man learns of her capture and tracks them, managing to save her from being sacrificed by La. La is crushed by Tarzan's spurning of her for Jane. After searching for Jane, Clayton is incapacitated with a fever and Thuran abandons him to die. Thuran discovers the other survivors from the Lady Alice who came to shore only a few miles away. He tells them that he is the sole survivor of his lifeboat.

Tarzan and Jane return to Jane's shelter, along the way encountering Busuli and a group of Waziri who have been searching for their king since he disappeared. At the shelter, Clayton is at the point of death. Before he dies, he reveals to Tarzan and Jane that he knows Tarzan is the true Lord Greystoke. Tarzan and Jane make their way up the coast to the former's boyhood cabin so they can bury Clayton alongside his aunt and uncle. Here they encounter the remainder of the castaways of the Lady Alice, who have been recovered by D'Arnot in a French navy vessel. Tarzan exposes Thuran as Rokoff and the French arrest him.

Tarzan weds Jane and Tennington weds Hazel in a double ceremony performed by Professor Porter, who had been ordained a minister in his youth. Then they all set sail for civilization, taking along the treasure Tarzan had found in Opar. The Waziri receive gifts from the French and reluctantly accept the departure of their king.

Film, TV or theatrical adaptations
Burroughs' novel was the basis of two movies, the silent films The Revenge of Tarzan (1920) and The Adventures of Tarzan (1921), based on the first and second parts of the book, respectively. The first film starred Gene Pollar as the ape man, and the second Elmo Lincoln, the original movie Tarzan.

Nikolas Rokoff and Alexis appears in The Legend Of Tarzan, in the episode “Tarzan and the Buried Treasure”.

Comic adaptations
The book has been adapted into comic form on a number of occasions, both in the original Tarzan comic strip and comic books. Notable adaptations include those of Gold Key Comics in Tarzan no. 156, dated November 1966 (script by Gaylord DuBois, art by Russ Manning), of DC Comics in Tarzan nos. 219-223, dated April–September 1973, and of Dynamite Entertainment in Lord of the Jungle nos. 9-14, dated 2012-2013.

Media references

Science fiction writer and Burroughs enthusiast Philip José Farmer later took up the city of Opar, as appearing in this and later Tarzan novels, and wrote the novels Hadon of Ancient Opar (1974) and Flight to Opar (1976), depicting the city in its full glory many thousands of years in the past.

References

External links

 
Text of the novel at Project Gutenberg

ERBzine.com Illustrated Bibliography: The Return of Tarzan
Edgar Rice Burroughs Summary Project page for The Return of Tarzan

1913 American novels
Tarzan novels by Edgar Rice Burroughs
Novels first published in serial form
1913 fantasy novels
American fantasy novels adapted into films
Works originally published in American magazines
Works originally published in pulp magazines
Lost world novels
A. C. McClurg books
Novels adapted into comics